Hal Mac Underwood (born November 9, 1945) is an American professional golfer.

Underwood played college golf at the University of Houston. He played on two NCAA Championship teams (1966 and 1967), was an All-American in 1966 and 1967, and won several college tournaments.

Underwood never won on the PGA Tour but finished runner-up to Gary Player in the 1971 Greater Jacksonville Open. He had a little more success internationally, winning the 1975 Portuguese Open on the European Tour and the two events on the Australian/New Zealand circuit. He also recorded a runner-up at the 1977 Malaysian Dunlop Masters.

Underwood was inducted into the Texas Golf Hall of Fame in 1991.

Amateur wins
1967 Eastern Amateur, Trans-Mississippi Amateur

Professional wins (3)

European Tour wins (1)

PGA Tour of Australasia wins (2)

PGA Tour of Australasia playoff record (1–0)

Playoff record
PGA Tour playoff record (0–1)

See also 

 Spring 1969 PGA Tour Qualifying School graduates

References

External links

American male golfers
Houston Cougars men's golfers
PGA Tour golfers
European Tour golfers
Golfers from Texas
People from Ballinger, Texas
1945 births
Living people